Chato Volcano, sometimes called "Cerro Chato" (Spanish for "Flat Hill"), is an inactive volcano in northwestern Costa Rica northwest of San José, in the province of Alajuela, canton of San Carlos, and district of La Fortuna. It is southeast of the nearby Arenal Volcano.

Cerro Chato is believed to have first erupted 38,000 years ago during the Pleistocene period and last erupted about 3,500 years ago. One of the lava flows is now the route for La Fortuna Waterfall. The hill has two peaks, named Chatito ("little Chato") and Espina ("thorn").

Hiking 

The Costa Rican government has closed the trail to Cerro Chato making it illegal to climb. This law was passed in 1998 but was not enforced until 2017, encouraging hikers, tour operators and business owners to sell this attraction and tour.  When it was open it was considered a difficult hike and only recommended for hikers of good physical condition. When it rains, the path becomes muddy and can make it even more treacherous, especially when descending into the crater itself. The environmental damage the illegal hiking has created is the main cause of the closure.

References
 [ Profile of Chato Volcano at Costa Rica's Seismic National Network]
 Basic limnology of fifty-one lakes in Costa Rica (contains some information on Laguna Cerro Chato)
 

Stratovolcanoes of Costa Rica
Mountains of Costa Rica
Inactive volcanoes
Pleistocene stratovolcanoes
Geography of Alajuela Province